Dr. Horrible's Sing-Along Blog is a 2008 musical comedy-drama miniseries in three acts, produced exclusively for Internet distribution. Filmed and set in Los Angeles, the show tells the story of Dr. Horrible (played by Neil Patrick Harris), an aspiring supervillain; Captain Hammer (Nathan Fillion), his superheroic nemesis; and Penny (Felicia Day), a charity worker and their shared love interest.

The series was written by writer/director Joss Whedon, his brothers Zack Whedon (a television writer) and Jed Whedon (a composer), and writer/actress Maurissa Tancharoen. The team wrote the musical during the 2007–2008 Writers Guild of America strike. The idea was to create something small and inexpensive, yet professionally done, in a way that would circumvent the issues that were being protested during the strike. Reception has been overwhelmingly positive. On October 31, 2008, Time magazine named it #15 in Time'''s Top 50 Inventions of 2008. It also won the People's Choice Award for "Favorite Online Sensation", and the 2009 Hugo Award for Best Dramatic Presentation, Short Form. In the inaugural 2009 Streamy Awards for web television, Dr. Horrible won seven awards: Audience Choice Award for Best Web Series, Best Directing for a Comedy Web Series, Best Writing for a Comedy Web Series, Best Male Actor in a Comedy Web Series (Harris), Best Editing, Best Cinematography, and Best Original Music. It also won a 2009 Creative Arts Emmy Award for Outstanding Special Class – Short-format Live-Action Entertainment Programs.

PlotDr. Horrible's Sing-Along Blog consists of three acts of approximately 14 minutes each. They were first released online in July 2008 as individual episodes, with two-day intervals between each release.

Act I
Dr. Horrible is filming an entry for his video blog, giving updates on his schemes and responding to various emails from his viewers. Asked about the "her" that he often mentions, he launches into a song about Penny, the girl he likes from the laundromat ("My Freeze Ray").

The song is cut short when his "evil moisture buddy" Moist brings up a letter from Bad Horse, the leader of the Evil League of Evil. The letter informs Dr. Horrible that his application for entry into the League will be evaluated, and that they will be watching for his next heinous crime ("Bad Horse Chorus").

The following day, Horrible prepares to steal a case of wonderflonium for his time-stopping Freeze Ray by commandeering the courier van using a remote control device. Penny happens to be on the same street ("Caring Hands"), and appears asking him to sign a petition to turn a condemned city building into a homeless shelter. However, the remote requires his attention, and he appears uninterested in her and her cause. As Penny leaves, Horrible is conflicted, but opts to steal the wonderflonium, telling himself that 'A man's gotta do what a man's gotta do' ("A Man's Gotta Do").

As Horrible remotely drives the van away, Captain Hammer appears and takes over Horrible's song, smashing the remote control receiver and inadvertently causing the van to veer towards Penny. Hammer pushes her out of the way (into a pile of garbage) just as Horrible regains control of the van and stops it, making it appear that Captain Hammer stopped the van with his bare hands. The two confront each other, with Hammer repeatedly slamming Horrible's head on the van's hood, but Penny emerges to thank Hammer, making him forget about beating up Dr. Horrible. As Hammer and Penny serenade each other, Horrible jealously glares at them while he makes off with the wonderflonium.

Act II
Dr. Horrible stalks Penny and Captain Hammer on their dates; Horrible sings of the misery of the human condition, and Penny sings of hope and the possibility of redemption ("My Eyes"). Penny and Horrible, known to her as Billy, begin to talk openly as friends.

On his blog, Horrible reveals that his Freeze Ray has been completed, and that he plans to use it the next day. The following post reveals that he has failed, as Hammer and the LAPD watch his blog, and they were ready for him with Hammer giving him a black eye. He then receives a phone call from Bad Horse and is reprimanded, saying that the only way to be inducted now is to commit an assassination ("Bad Horse Chorus (Reprise)"). Horrible is conflicted and can't decide on a victim, or even if he wants to commit a murder at all, even though the League will deny his application if he doesn't.

Billy chats with Penny over frozen yogurt, at the laundromat, about his problems ("Penny's Song"). As they grow closer, Penny mentions that Captain Hammer is planning to drop by. Billy panics and tries to leave, only to run into Hammer as he walks in. They feign ignorance on recognizing each other, but when Penny leaves them alone, Hammer reveals that he recognizes Billy as Dr. Horrible.  Captain Hammer then taunts Dr. Horrible about his crush on Penny, happy to be taking the thing that Dr. Horrible wants most. It becomes obvious that Hammer doesn't really care about Penny but just wants to sleep with her to spite Horrible. Horrible decides to kill Hammer as his heinous crime for admission to Bad Horse's Evil League of Evil ("Brand New Day").

Act III
The city is abuzz with Captain Hammer's crusade to help the homeless and he is considered the city's new hero; Penny ponders her relationship with Captain Hammer, waiting at the laundromat to share frozen yogurt with an absent Billy; and Dr. Horrible goes into seclusion while obsessively constructing a Death Ray to kill Captain Hammer once and for all ("So They Say").

At the opening for the new homeless shelter, where a statue of Captain Hammer will be unveiled, Captain Hammer begins a speech of encouragement to the homeless, but it degenerates into self-centered, condescending praise of his own excellence and relationship with Penny ("Everyone's a Hero"). Penny, embarrassed and disillusioned, quietly tries to leave as the crowd joins in singing Hammer's song, but they are interrupted by the appearance of Dr. Horrible, who uses the Freeze Ray on Captain Hammer, cutting his song short. Dr. Horrible taunts the shocked crowd and declares that they cannot recognize that Hammer's disguise is "slipping", and he reveals a second, more lethal laser gun: his completed Death Ray ("Slipping").

At last, Horrible aims the lethal weapon at the frozen form of Captain Hammer, but hesitates. At that moment the Freeze Ray unexpectedly fails, and a suddenly revived Hammer punches Horrible across the room. The Death Ray falls from his hands, damaging it. Hammer then picks up the Death Ray, turns it on Horrible, and triumphantly completes the final note of his prior song. However, ignoring Dr. Horrible's warnings, Hammer pulls the trigger and the damaged Death Ray misfires. The weapon explodes in Hammer's hands, injuring him and causing him pain, apparently for the first time in his life. He flees, a wailing wreck, asking for "someone maternal". Dr. Horrible realizes suddenly that he has succeeded in vanquishing his nemesis, but still having not committed the murder required by the League. Unfortunately, he discovers Penny slumped against a wall, impaled by shrapnel from the exploding weapon. Tragically, she dies in Horrible's arms, deliriously reassuring him that Captain Hammer will save them.

Dr. Horrible declares a Pyrrhic victory, with "the world [he] wanted, at [his] feet", seeing that her death is ironically the murder he required. In the aftermath, Horrible gains infamy and is free to commit additional crimes unfettered by Captain Hammer, who is seen on a psychiatric couch sobbing to his therapist. Horrible becomes a member of the League, striding into a party in celebration of his induction, attended by Moist and the villains Pink Pummeller and Purple Pimp.

Dr. Horrible, donning a new outfitred coat, black gloves and his goggles covering his eyestakes his seat at the League, composed of fellow super-villains Tie-Die, Snake Bite, Professor Normal, Dead Bowie, Fake Thomas Jefferson, Fury Leika, and Bad Horse (who proves to be an actual horse). He addresses the camera, saying, "now the nightmare's real", and in working "to make the whole world kneel", that "[He] won't feel...". He completes the line "...a thing" in a final blog post as Billy, out of costume, staring into the camera. ("Everything You Ever").

Soundtrack

The musical contains 14 songs, including credits and reprises, but at the time of broadcast the song titles were not identified. The soundtrack was released through the iTunes Store on September 1, 2008 and was released on CD in the US on December 15, 2008.Dr. Horrible's Sing-Along Blog Soundtrack made the top 40 Album list on release, despite being a digital exclusive only available on iTunes.

Musical numbers
Act I
"Dr. Horrible Theme" – Instrumental
"My Freeze Ray" – Dr. Horrible
"Bad Horse Chorus" – Bad Horse Chorus
"Caring Hands" – Penny
"A Man's Gotta Do" – Dr. Horrible, Penny & Captain Hammer

Act II
"Dr. Horrible Theme" – Instrumental
"My Eyes" – Dr. Horrible & Penny
"Bad Horse Chorus (Reprise)" – Bad Horse Chorus
"Penny's Song" – Penny
"Brand New Day" – Dr. Horrible

Act III
"Dr. Horrible Theme" – Instrumental
"So They Say" – Movers, Captain Hammer Groupies, Penny, Captain Hammer, News Anchors & Dr. Horrible
"Everyone's a Hero" – Captain Hammer & Groupies
"Slipping" – Dr. Horrible
"Everything You Ever/Finale" – Dr. Horrible & Groupies
"End Credits" – Instrumental

Cast

 Neil Patrick Harris as Billy/Dr. Horrible: An aspiring supervillain of the mad scientist variety with the catchphrase "I've got a Ph.D. in Horribleness". He desires to become a member of Bad Horse's Evil League of Evil and use his inventions to take over the world and enact social change for the betterment of humanity. His socio-political beliefs include the paradoxical idea of autocratic anarchy: "The world is a mess, and I just... need to rule it". As Billy, he struggles to make a romantic connection with Penny.
 Nathan Fillion as Captain Hammer: Dr. Horrible's archenemy, a superhero who possesses super-human strength and near-invulnerability. Hammer is self-centered and enjoys harassing Dr. Horrible even when the situation does not warrant it.
 Felicia Day as Penny: Dr. Horrible's love interest. She is idealistic, generous, and volunteers at a homeless shelter.
 Simon Helberg as Moist: Dr. Horrible's friend and sidekick, who has the underwhelming ability to dampen things. Dr. Horrible calls him "my evil moisture buddy".

Several colleagues of Joss Whedon have cameo roles in the series. Marti Noxon, an executive producer on Buffy the Vampire Slayer, portrays a newsreader alongside Buffy and Angel writer David Fury. Buffy and Angel writers Doug Petrie and Drew Goddard cameo as supervillains Professor Normal and Fake Thomas Jefferson, respectively. Jed, Joss, and Zack Whedon all provide the singing voices of Bad Horse Chorus. Zack also plays the man who rolls the gurney with Penny on it out of frame, and Jed Whedon also appears as the supervillain Dead Bowie, while Maurissa Tancharoen and Stacy Shirk play superhero/supervillain groupies; Tancharoen also performs the background voice on "Everything You Ever".

Production
Joss Whedon funded the project himself (at just over $200,000) and enjoyed the independence of acting as his own studio. "Freedom is glorious," he comments. "And the fact is, I've had very good relationships with studios, and I've worked with a lot of smart executives. But there is a difference when you can just go ahead and do something." As a web show, there were fewer constraints imposed on the project, and Whedon had the "freedom to just let the dictates of the story say how long it's gonna be. We didn't have to cram everything in—there is a lot in there—but we put in the amount of story that we wanted to and let the time work around that. We aimed for thirty minutes, we came out at forty two, and that's not a problem." Some of the music was influenced by Stephen Sondheim.

The production of the DVD included a contest, announced at Comic-Con, in which fans submitted a three-minute video explaining why they should be inducted into the Evil League of Evil. Ten winning submissions have been added to the DVD release.

Recording locations
The songs were recorded in a small studio set up in Joss Whedon's loft. Dr. Horrible was shot in Los Angeles, with five locations on one soundstage, and one day of filming at the Universal Studios backlot street set, including the scenes of the van heist, and the giant Dr. Horrible crushing people beneath his feet. Dr. Horrible's home, used for blogging scenes as well as the final party scene, is the house featured in the "Mad Scientist House" episode of Monster House.

Distribution
Whedon has said that the plan was to find a venue for the series that would enable it to earn its money back and pay the crew. This plan was to release the show onto the Internet, with an iTunes release to follow. If the Internet and iTunes releases were successful enough, Whedon planned to greenlight an official DVD, which would include some "amazing extras".

The musical's fansite launched in March 2008 (despite the official site containing nothing more than a poster at the time) and was the first place to publicly release the teaser trailer three months later on June 25, 2008.

Online
The episodes first aired at the Official Dr. Horrible website, hosted on Hulu, accessible internationally (unusual for the US-based service whose videos are typically not accessible to Internet users who reside outside the US) and free to watch (ad-supported). Act I premiered on Tuesday, July 15, 2008; Act II followed two days later on July 17; and Act III surfaced on July 19. The episodes were taken offline on July 20 as planned, but became available again on July 28. The show was later (date unknown) restricted to the United States only.

On October 10, 2009, all three acts were made available via iTunes for the UK and Australia. The film is also available from Amazon Video on Demand. On November 29, 2009, all three acts, both separate and together, were taken off Hulu. On February 22, 2010, the full feature became available to stream on Netflix, with all three episodes appearing sequentially. On March 20, 2014, it was removed from Netflix.

DVD and Blu-ray
On November 28, 2008, the Official Dr. Horrible website announced that pre-orders were being taken for the DVD. The following day Tubefilter reported that pre-orders of the Dr. Horrible DVD were "booming".

The DVD was released exclusively at Amazon.com on December 19, 2008, in the United States and on January 13, 2009, in Canada at Amazon.ca.

The DVD is region free. During pre-ordering the Amazon page stated the discs would be manufactured on demand using recordable media. Although some customers report receiving DVD-R discs (identified by a purple data-side), most are receiving pressed discs.

On June 2, 2009, a new release of Dr. Horrible's Sing-Along Blog was produced by New Video Group, which included the same materials as the Amazon DVD but was distributed through regular retail outlets. A Blu-ray version was released on May 25, 2010, from New Video Group.

Special features on the DVD and Blu-ray include Commentary! The Musical; commentary by the cast and creators; behind-the-scenes featurettes on the making of the movie and the music; the top 10 Evil League of Evil application videos from fans; and four easter eggs.

Commentary! The Musical
The DVD and Blu-ray versions of Dr. Horrible include as an extra Commentary! The Musical, a commentary track comprising entirely new songs performed by the cast and crew, thus creating another whole musical on its own. The actors and writers sing various songs both as solos and with the entire company, playing versions of themselves. Commentary! is partly self-referential, and one of the co-creators, Zack Whedon, self-referentially comments that one song "wasn't even about the movie, it was about itself", which he claims is "like breaking the ninth wall". As of January 8, 2010, Commentary! The Musical has been for sale on the iTunes Music Store.

Musical numbers
"Commentary!" – Company
"Strike" – Company
"Ten-Dollar Solo" – Stacy Shirk (as Groupie #2), Neil Patrick Harris
"Better (Than Neil)" – Nathan Fillion
"It's All About the Art" – Felicia Day
"Zack's Flavor" – Zack Whedon, female backups, Joss Whedon
"Nobody Wants To Be Moist" – Simon Helberg (as Moist)
"Ninja Ropes" – Jed Whedon, Neil Patrick Harris, Nathan Fillion
"All About Me" – Extras
"Nobody's Asian in the Movies" – Maurissa Tancharoen
"Heart (Broken)" – Joss Whedon, backups (Jed Whedon, Zack Whedon, Maurissa Tancharoen)
"Neil's Turn" – Neil Patrick Harris
"Commentary! (Reprise)" – Company
"Steve's Song" – Steve Berg

Profits
All proceeds from iTunes and DVD sales were dedicated to paying the cast and crew, who were not compensated at the time of production. In November 2008, Joss Whedon blogged about Dr. Horrible's Sing-Along Blog and stated that due to its success they had been able to pay the crew and the bills. Later, in 2012, Joss Whedon said during an interview with Forbes that "with the movie and the soundtrack and everything we’ve been able to do with it, we made over $3 million with it".

Television broadcast
The three-part series made its television broadcast debut on October 9, 2012, airing at 9:00 pm on The CW. It was edited to fit the 42 minutes needed for a one-hour time slot.

Comic books

Tie-in comic books for Dr. Horrible's Sing-Along Blog have been released by Dark Horse Comics. The first three were through its online comics anthology Dark Horse Presents, the fourth was a special release as part of the "One Shot Wonders" series. All four were written by Zack Whedon.

 "Captain Hammer: Be Like Me!" was released in issue #12 and featured art by Eric Canete.
 "Moist: Humidity Rising" was released in issue #17 with art by Farel Dalrymple.
 "Penny: Keep Your Head Up" appears in issue #23 with art by Jim Rugg.
 "Dr. Horrible" was released as a special one-shot comic, detailing Dr. Horrible's origin story, with art by Joëlle Jones.

All four stories were collected in Dr. Horrible, and Other Horrible Stories by Dark Horse Comics, in September 2010. The collection also features an additional story about the Evil League of Evil.

In November 2018, a new comic was released written by Joss Whedon titled Dr. Horrible: Best Friends Forever with art by Jose Maria Beroy and Sara Soler. The comic was the first story to be set after the events of the musical itself.

Book
On March 29, 2011, Dr. Horrible's Sing-Along Blog Book was published by Titan Books. The book contains essays by Whedon, Fillion, Harris, Day, and Helberg; the complete shooting script; the script for Commentary: The Musical; and piano/vocal sheet music for Dr. Horrible's Sing-Along Blog.

Stage events
On August 29, 2008, the first authorized sing-along version of Dr. Horrible's Sing-Along Blog was hosted at Dragon Con in Atlanta, Georgia, with showings reaching standing-room-only capacity. Felicia Day showed up to one of the showings.

Stage productions of the show have become very popular at colleges and high schools.

In October 2010, Ireland, an official production of the musical was performed in Trinity College Dublin by the college's drama society; The DU Players. The show took place from October 25–29, 2010. In November 2010, Cult Classic Theatre in Glasgow, Scotland, performed the first official UK production of Dr. Horrible's Sing-Along Blog.

In January 2011, Balagan Theatre performed Dr. Horrible's Sing-Along Blog at the ACT Theatre's Allen Theatre in Seattle. The production was reviewed by Broadway World. A televised performance of a concert version of "Freeze Ray" can also be viewed. In 2011, all rights to perform Dr. Horrible's Sing-Along Blog or Commentary! The Musical were no longer being granted by the creators.

Reception

Critical response

In a review for the Los Angeles Times, Robert Lloyd writes: "It is a sweet, rather sad piece that — like the songs, by Whedon and his brother Jed, which are at once mock-heroic and actually heroic, mock-moving and moving in fact — works both as parody and as a drama."

Awards
2009 Streamy Awards
Audience Choice Award for Best Web Series
Best Male Actor in a Comedy Web SeriesNeil Patrick Harris
Best Directing for a Comedy Web Series
Best Writing for a Comedy Web Series

2009 Hugo Awards
 Best Dramatic Presentation, Short Form

2009 People's Choice Awards
Best Internet Phenomenon Award

2009 Primetime Creative Arts Emmy Awards
Outstanding Special ClassShort-format Live-Action Entertainment Programs

During the broadcast of the 2009 Primetime Emmy Awards ceremony, which was hosted by Harris, a speech by representatives of Ernst & Young was "interrupted" by a sketch featuring Harris as Dr. Horrible and Nathan Fillion as Captain Hammer, with cameos by Felicia Day and Simon Helberg.

Nominations
2008 Constellation Awards
 Best Science Fiction Film, TV Movie, or Mini-Series of 2008
 Best Male Performance in a 2008 Science Fiction Film, TV Movie, or Mini-Series (Neil Patrick Harris as Dr. Horrible)

Controversy
Fans of internet personality Doctor Steel, who had been performing under the name since 1999, noted similarities between Doctor Steel and Dr. Horrible, attracting the attention of national media. Dr. Horrible co-writer Maurissa Tancharoen responded, "All we have to say on the subject is we've never heard of Dr. Steel before... There's room for everyone in this party."

Unproduced sequel
Since the series' release in 2008, there have been rumors of a sequel; however, it remains one of Joss Whedon's unrealized projects. In 2009, Joss Whedon announced at San Diego Comic-Con that a sequel was in the works and that it might be presented as either another web series or as a feature film. Nathan Fillion also said that he knew the title of the sequel, but was unwilling to reveal it at the time.

In an April 2011 interview in The New York Times, Whedon said "We've got several songs near completion and we've got a very specific structure," and that the cast of Dr. Horrible have sung the songs at casual gatherings.

While promoting Marvel Studios' The Avengers in March 2012, Whedon said he and the writers involved in Dr. Horrible would be working on writing the script during the 2012 summer. At the San Diego Comic-Con in July, Whedon announced that he planned to shoot Dr. Horrible 2 by spring 2013. However, due to his commitment on Marvel's Agents of S.H.I.E.L.D. and Avengers: Age of Ultron, Whedon told E! News in an April 2013 interview that production on the sequel would be delayed.

In April 2015, Whedon stated in an update that "I was starting to feel like, I don't know if that's [possible]. Everybody's so busy, and we've all changed. I saw Neil do Hedwig [on Broadway], and went backstage, and the first thing he said was, 'When are we doing a sequel?!' I'm like, OK! Maybe that's still on! So it'll be interesting to see when we come up for air on it. Not sure. But god knows, we have the people. We have the technology. We can rebuild it."

In March 2019, Harris, while promoting the Netflix series A Series of Unfortunate Events, expressed his doubts on if a sequel to Dr. Horrible'' would ever happen stating "I have no information. I haven't seen Joss in ages and everyone's wonderfully busy with other things. So, unless the writers want to strike again, which is when we did the first one, I'm not sure when it would ever happen." Harris goes on to address his current age with "I'm no spring chicken. So, at a certain point, Dr. Horrible isn't Billy the Internet geeky kid anymore. I'm a grown man. So they'll probably have to cast Nick Jonas in it."

References

External links

 
 
 

2008 comedy films
2008 films
2000s musical films
2008 web series debuts
2008 web series endings
American superhero films
Supervillain films
American comedy web series
Films directed by Joss Whedon
Hugo Award for Best Dramatic Presentation, Short Form-winning works
Hugo Award-winning television series
Science fiction musical films
Films shot in Los Angeles
Films with screenplays by Joss Whedon
Superhero comedy films
Superhero web series
2000s American films